Sergei Yevgenyevich Artyukhin (1 November 1976 – 12 September 2012), also known as Siarhei Artsiukhin, was a Russian-Belarusian heavyweight Greco-Roman wrestler. He was born in Moscow and won the 2001 World Cup while representing Russia. After that, to avoid severe competition within Russia, he competed for Belarus and won the European title in 2005 and bronze medals at the world championships in 2005 and 2006. At the 2008 Summer Olympics, he was eliminated in his second bout. He was initially trained by his father, Evgeny Artyukhin, Sr., who was also an international heavyweight Greco-Roman wrestler.

His younger brother, also named Evgeny, is a professional ice hockey player. Sergei retired from wrestling in 2009, and often played recreational ice hockey. He suddenly died of a heart attack after a hockey game, aged 35.

References

External links
 

1976 births
2012 deaths
Russian male sport wrestlers
Belarusian male sport wrestlers
Olympic wrestlers of Belarus
Wrestlers at the 2008 Summer Olympics